Tanka torani ( taṅka torāṇi) is a drink made from one-day-old cooked rice known as anna which is a part of Mahaprasada offered to Lord Jagannatha . 
It is available round the year in Ananda Bajara and is specially relished during summer.

Recipe
Tanka Toraaṇi is made using the following ingredients:
 Cooked rice
 Curd
 Water
 Ginger
 Mango Ginger
 Green chilies
 Salt
 Roasted cumin powder
 Lemon leaves
 Curry leaves
 Basil leaves
 Lemon

Take one-day-old cooked rice along with the rice water. The rice is mashed and water and curd is added to it till the consistency is that of a drink. All the spices are then added and mixed thoroughly. The mixture is then kept for 2–3 hours and then served cold. It is traditionally made in earthen pots so that it remains cool.

See also
 List of Indian drinks

References 

Indian drinks
Odia cuisine